This is a listing of the horses that finished in either first, second, or third place and number of starters in the Breeders' Cup Classic, North America's richest horse race run as a grade one on dirt, it is the final race on Saturday of the Breeders' Cup World Thoroughbred Championships.

See also 

 Breeders' Cup World Thoroughbred Championships
 Breeders' Cup Distaff (sister race)

External links 
Official Breeders' Cup website

References 
 

Classic
Lists of horse racing results